The 2023 Hampton Pirates football team will represent the Hampton University as a member of the Colonial Athletic Association (CAA) during the 2023 NCAA Division I FCS football season. Led by fourth-year head coach Robert Prunty, the Pirates play home games at the Armstrong Stadium in Hampton, Virginia.

Previous season

The Pirates finished the 2022 season with an overall record of 4–7 and a mark of 1–7 in conference play to place in a tie for last in the CAA.

Schedule

References

Hampton
Hampton Pirates football seasons
Hampton Pirates football